Jiang Yilun (born 12 February 1993) is a Chinese curler from Harbin.

Career
She competed at the 2014 Winter Olympics in Sochi, where the Chinese team participated in the women's curling tournament. She has also competed in three World Curling Championships (and ), three Pacific-Asia Curling Championships (2013, 2017 and 2018) and the 2010 World Junior Curling Championships.

On the World Curling Tour, Jiang has won the 2013 Shamrock Shotgun and the 2019 Hokkaido Bank Curling Classic.

Teams

References

External links

1993 births
Living people
Chinese female curlers
Curlers at the 2014 Winter Olympics
Olympic curlers of China
Sportspeople from Harbin
21st-century Chinese women